Lionel Godfried Lord (born November 3, 1980 in Middelburg) is a Dutch of Suriname descent football striker who last played for Eendracht Aalst in Belgium.

External links
Lionel Lord at "Voetbal International"

1980 births
Living people
SC Heerenveen players
Eredivisie players
Eerste Divisie players
Dutch footballers
Dutch sportspeople of Surinamese descent
People from Middelburg, Zeeland
Association football forwards
Footballers from Zeeland
Expatriate footballers in Belgium
Dutch expatriate footballers
Dutch expatriate sportspeople in Albania
SC Cambuur players
FC Dordrecht players
Dutch expatriate sportspeople in Germany
Expatriate footballers in Germany
Fortuna Sittard players
K.V. Oostende players
Sportfreunde Siegen players
S.C. Eendracht Aalst players